HD 214810 is a visual binary star in the equatorial constellation of Aquarius. The pair orbit each other with a period of about 54.2 years.

References

External links
 Image HD 214810

Aquarius (constellation)
214810
Binary stars
G-type main-sequence stars
8629
111965
Durchmusterung objects